Bab El Allouj is one of the gates of the medina of Tunis.

Built under the Hafsid sultan Abū lshâq Ibrâhîm al-Mustansir (1349–1369), it was named Bab er-Rehiba or "the small esplanade gate". In 1435, it took the name of Bab El Allouj, when Sultan Abu Amr Uthman brought his mother's family from Italy (his mother was a former Italian captive) and installed her in the esplanade quarter which became Rahbat El Allouj,  (in the singular ), describing white foreigners and often Christian slaves.

References

External links

Allouj